The Pearl Jam 2012 Tour was a concert tour by the American rock band Pearl Jam. The first leg of the tour consisted of thirteen shows in Europe, including a headling appearance at the Isle of Wight Festival. American punk band X were the opening band for the arena shows. Due to high ticket demand for pre-sale tickets, the third-party website handling the sale had to be taken offline. The Pearl Jam fanclub cited "an act of sabotage" to the site. For the second show at the Ziggo Dome in Amsterdam, a fan of the band created the setlist.

In May 2012, Pearl Jam announced they were playing three festival dates in the US, including a headling slot at Jay-Z's Made in America Music Festival. In June 2012, the band announced they would be playing at the Adams Centre in Missoula, Montana. This was scheduled to be the band's only non-festival show in the United States in 2012.

At the Made in America Festival, Pearl Jam were joined onstage by Jay Z to perform the song "99 Problems". For their appearance at Made In America, the band earned $2 million. Some of the footage of Pearl Jam's set featured in the 2013 documentary film Made in America, directed by Ron Howard.

Opening acts
X (excluding festivals)
Mudhoney (Missoula only)

Tour dates

Festivals and other miscellaneous performances
This concert is a part of "Isle of Wight Festival"
This concert is a part of "Rock Werchter"
This concert is a part of "Main Square Festival"
This concert is a part of "Budweiser Made in America Festival"
This concert is a part of "De Luna Festival"
This concert is a part of "Music Midtown Festival"

Band members
Pearl Jam
Jeff Ament – bass guitar
Stone Gossard – rhythm guitar, lead guitar
Mike McCready – lead guitar
Eddie Vedder – lead vocals, guitar
Matt Cameron – drums

Additional musicians
Boom Gaspar – Hammond B3 and keyboards

Gallery

References

2012 concert tours
Pearl Jam concert tours